Holy Angels School is a higher-secondary co-education private school in Rajpura, Patiala, Punjab. The school was founded in 1975 and is affiliated to the Indian Certificate of Secondary Education of India. The principal of the school currently is P.M. Philip. Thomas Kunapalli was the former principal of the school.

References 

Co-educational schools in India
High schools and secondary schools in Patiala
Educational institutions established in 1975
1975 establishments in Punjab, India